Wolfgang Kaim (born 13 May 1951 in Bad Vilbel, Germany) is a German chemist who held the chair of coordination chemistry at the University of Stuttgart. He is co-author of the internationally recognized book, Bioinorganic Chemistry which was awarded with the Literature Award of the German Chemical Industry.

Career
Kaim studied chemistry and physics at the University of Frankfurt and the University of Konstanz. His diploma thesis in physical organic chemistry was supervised by E. Daltrozzo (1974). He started working on main group radicals in Hans Bock’s group at the University of Frankfurt, where he earned his PhD in 1978. After a post-doctoral year with F. A. Cotton at Texas A&M University, supported by a postdoctoral Liebig Fellowship, he completed his habilitation for inorganic chemistry in 1982 ("Coordination Chemistry of Reduced Heterocycles"). Kaim continued his independent research career at the University of Frankfurt with a Winnacker Fellowship followed by a Heisenberg Fellowship. In 1987 he moved to the University of Stuttgart to take up a chaired position for coordination chemistry until 2019.

Kaim is an adjunct professor at the Northern Illinois University (USA), and has been visiting professor at the Sun Yat-sen University in Guangzhou (China), guest professor at the Universidad de Chile in Santiago (Chile), the University of Concepción (Chile) and the Indian Institute of Technology Bombay (India).

He has been the advisor of more than 70 PhD students.

In 2014 he was awarded the Alfred Stock Memorial Prize by the Gesellschaft Deutscher Chemiker (GDCh). In the same year he received the L. F. Leloir Award from Argentina.

Research
Kaim’s interdisciplinary research covers the areas of radical stabilization by metal coordination (‘non-innocent ligands’), coenzyme models, the extension of mixed-valence chemistry, electron transfer effects on M-C and M-H bonds, the crystallization of new organic radicals and the electron transfer properties of boron compounds, as well as spectroelectrochemistry in the IR, UV/VIS/near-infrared regions as spectroscopic probes for electron transfer sites and the consequences of electron transfer or charge transfer on structure and bonding, EPR spectroscopy as a less common but highly useful methodology and CV (cyclic voltammetry).

He is the co-author of more than 700 publications in peer-reviewed journals.

Major reviews

References

20th-century German chemists
1951 births
Living people